In gastroenterology, the puddle sign is a physical examination maneuver that can be used to detect the presence of ascites.  It is useful for detecting small amounts of ascites—as small as 120 mL; shifting dullness and bulging flanks typically require 500 mL.

The steps are outlined as follows:
 Patient lies prone for 5 minutes
 Patient then rises onto elbows and knees
 Apply stethoscope diaphragm to most dependent part of the abdomen
 Examiner repeatedly flicks near flank with finger. Continue to flick at same spot on abdomen 
 Move stethoscope across abdomen away from examiner
 Sound loudness increases at farther edge of puddle
 Sound transmission does not change when patient sits

In relation to auscultatory percussion, the puddle sign is more specific, but less sensitive.

See also
Abdominal examination
Fluid wave test
Bulging flanks

References

External links

Medical signs